Ralph Millington (18 June 1930 – December 1999) was an English footballer who played as centre half for Neston, Tranmere Rovers and Ellesmere Port. He made 381 appearances for Tranmere, of which 357 were in the English Football League.

References

1930 births
1999 deaths
Ellesmere Port Town F.C. players
Tranmere Rovers F.C. players
People from Neston
Association football central defenders
English footballers
English Football League players